Lewistown Halt railway station served the village of Lewistown, in the historical county of Glamorgan, Wales, from 1942 to 1951 on the Ogmore Valley Railway.

History 
The station was opened on 10 August 1942 by the Great Western Railway. It was a short-lived station, only being open for just under 9 years, closing on 4 June 1951.

References 

Disused railway stations in Bridgend County Borough
Former Great Western Railway stations
Railway stations in Great Britain opened in 1942
Railway stations in Great Britain closed in 1951
1942 establishments in Wales
1951 disestablishments in Wales